Walter Sutherland (died  1850) was a Scottish man who was reportedly the last native speaker of Norn, a North Germanic language which had once been spoken throughout Shetland, Orkney and Caithness. Sutherland was from Skaw, on the island of Unst and lived in the northernmost house in the British Isles, near the present-day Unst Boat Haven.

Sutherland may, however, have been merely the last native speaker of Norn on Unst. Some unnamed Norn-speakers of the island of Foula were reported by Jakob Jakobsen to have survived much later than the middle of the 19th century.

Notes

Last known speakers of a language
History of Shetland
Norn language
People from Unst
Year of birth missing
Year of death missing